The 2021 City of Lincoln Council election took place on 6 May 2021 to elect members of City of Lincoln Council in Lincolnshire, England. This was held on the same day as other local elections. One third 33 seats were up for election, with one councillors in each of the 11 wards being elected.  As the election in 2016 had  been an all-out election with new ward boundaries, the seats of the candidates that had finished first in each ward in the all-out 2016 election were now up for election.

Results summary

Ward results

Abbey

Birchwood

Boultham

Carholme

Castle

Glebe

Hartsholme

Minster

Moorland

Park

Witham

References

Lincoln
2021
2020s in Lincolnshire
May 2021 events in the United Kingdom